Sahitya Akademi Award to Gujarati Writers by Sahitya Akademi. No Awards were conferred in 1957, 1959, 1966 and 1972. In 1969, Swami Anand, in 1983, Suresh Joshi, and in 2009 Shirish Panchal refused this award.

Recipients

References

Sahitya Akademi Award
Gujarati
Gujarati literary awards